Telekom Romania Mobile Communications S.A. is a mobile network company in Romania, wholly owned by OTE, which in turn is controlled by Deutsche Telekom, operating under Telekom brand. Telekom Romania Mobile had 3.5 million subscribers with 15% market share as of July 2021.

The network operated together with Telekom Romania Communications since 2014 until 2021 under the same brand Telekom. Both companies were majority owned by OTE, which in turn is controlled by Deutsche Telekom.

On November 6, 2020, OTE agreed to sell the 54% stake in the fixed network company Telekom Romania Communications to Orange Romania for €295 million. In order for the transaction to be approved by the authorities, OTE has committed to buy the remaining 30% of shares in Telekom Romania Mobile, which operates the mobile network. The transaction was completed in July 2021. 

OTE did not succeed in selling the mobile phone company after the transaction with Digi failed due to the fact that only wanted to buy cell sites and mobile frequencies, thus making Deutsche Telekom to rebranded it as Telekom Mobile and keep the company in OTE's portfolio until it finds a buyer.

History

Cosmorom 
The company was launched as Cosmorom in 1999 by Romtelecom and entered service in April 2000. In the first years, the company failed to gain market share. Having around 1% market share and financial losses, there were talks about the selling of the company, but the decision was delayed several times due to disagreement between OTE, the majority owner of Romtelecom and the Romanian Government. In January 2004 Romtelecom decided to sell a majority stake in the company. Buying offers were made by Mobilkom (now A1 Telekom Austria), which was seen as a favorite, and the Hungarian company Matev of Deutsche Telekom. But in the end, the Greek company OTE, which owned 54% of Cosmorom's parent company, decided to buy 70% of the company, leaving Romtelecom with the remaining 30%.

Cosmote Romania
In July 2005 OTE's mobile division Cosmote relaunched the mobile operator separate from the fixed services company Romtelecom, with a popular offer for prepaid services. In December 2005 had approximately 50,000 subscribers. The process of relaunching, started with the rebranding as Cosmote on 6 December 2005. On 2 March 2006 started a wide advertising campaign on prepaid market, offering a limited number of SIM cards with 2000 free minutes within the network per month for a low price (3 euro). The network could no longer cope with the large number of users and network failures often occurred. So on March 20, the company announced that the offer will work until March 31 only for people who have activated the service until March 22.

On 30 June 2009 Cosmote acquired Zapp Mobile, a CDMA mobile operator with 374,000 subscribers, who also had a 3G license. Following Zapp acquisition, Cosmote launched 3G service. At the end of 2013, Cosmote Romania had 6.1 million customers, of which 25.9% were postpaid subscribers and the rest were users of prepaid services.

Telekom Romania

On 12 September 2014, Romtelecom and Cosmote România unified mobile and fixed services under a single brand and changed their respective legal names to Telekom Romania Communications and Telekom Romania Mobile Communications. The company tried to attract postpaid customers, including with bundling mobile and fixed services, but the market share dropped. The company raised prices, but financial losses continued.

Radio Frequency Summary

References

External links
 

Mobile phone companies of Romania
Romanian companies established in 1999
Companies based in Bucharest
Deutsche Telekom